Basab (also Romanized as Basāb; also known as Besāb Maḩmūdābād and Maḩmūdābād) is a village in Sabzdasht Rural District, in the Central District of Bafq County, Yazd Province, Iran. At the 2006 census, its population was 171, in 51 families.

References 

Populated places in Bafq County